Ten Thousand Villages is a nonprofit fair trade organization that markets handcrafted products made by disadvantaged artisans from more than 120 artisan groups in more than 35 countries.

As one of the world’s largest and oldest fair trade organizations, Ten Thousand Villages cultivates long-term buying relationships in which artisans receive a fair price for their work and consumers have access to gifts, accessories, and home décor from around the world. Ten Thousand Villages is a founding member of the World Fair Trade Organization (WFTO) and a certified member of the Fair Trade Federation (FTF).

History

Edna Ruth Byler was moved to take action by the poverty she witnessed during a trip to Puerto Rico in 1946. 

Byler, with the help of the Mennonite Central Committee, began selling handcrafted products out of the trunk of her car, eventually expanding to a storefront called Self Help Crafts in 1958. She sought to provide sustainable economic opportunities for artisans in developing countries by creating a viable marketplace for their products. The original philosophy of Ten Thousand Villages was inspired by Mennonite values including compassion, service, mutual aid, and peacemaking. 

Over 30 years, Byler worked to connect individual entrepreneurs in developing countries with market opportunities in North America.

In the 1970s the small project moved out of Byler's basement to become SELFHELP Crafts of the World, an official program of Mennonite Central Committee. In 1994 the company became a member of the Fair Trade Federation. In 1996, SELFHELP became Ten Thousand Villages. The new name was inspired by Mahatma Gandhi who said, “India is not to be found in its few cities but in the 700,000 villages”. 

In 2006-2007 fiscal year, the company increased purchases from artisans by more than one million dollars. In 2007, Ten Thousand Villages redesigned stores to minimize environmental impact in order to meet what they call their "triple bottom line" of economic, environmental and social sustainability.

By 2008, the company’s sales had surpassed $25.5 million, one third of which was paid to artisans directly. The other two thirds covered importing, storage, marketing, retail costs, and administration.

In 2012, Ten Thousand Villages and Mennonite Central Committee entered a partnership agreement. Ten Thousand Villages is no longer wholly owned by MCC.

In 2019 Gordon Zoo became the company's CEO.

In June 2020, Ten Thousand Villages Canada closed corporate operations. Through a licensing agreement, four stores using the Ten Thousand Villages brand remained open. A few other stores rebranded and continued operating independently.

In May 2022 Dan Alonso was named as the new CEO of the company.

Artisan partners

Ten Thousand Villages encourages artisans to employ production methods that are environmentally sustainable and to use recycled and natural materials whenever possible.

Ten Thousand Villages establishes long-term trade relationships with groups that work with craftspeople who are in need of work and who produce crafts that are more likely to be sold in North America. Most of these groups are found in Asia, Africa, Latin America and the Middle East. The company often selects artisan partners that provide training and employment to those who have virtually no chance of securing employment in the mainstream labor market. Many of these artisans are disadvantaged because of disability or gender.

Ten Thousand Villages also purchases from export businesses that market handicraft products on behalf of artisans who lack access to markets. These groups provide tools and sustainable sources of income for small artisan workshops to develop their infrastructure and build business capacity.

Prices are determined by a combination of what the artisan believes fair and demand in the foreign market. Artisans are paid up-front fifty percent of the agreed-upon price in order to help them pay for the raw materials used in their products; the other fifty percent is paid once the products are complete. The artisans are paid in full before their products are sold in North America, even if they never get sold. Ten Thousand Villages’ marketing director Doug Dirks estimated that market prices abroad are up to five times what is paid to the artisan. He said that his company is willing to take that risk because they feel that it is important to what they do. Most of the artisans in these countries cannot obtain business loans from their local banks.

Operations

The Ten Thousand Villages USA headquarters is currently located in Akron, Pennsylvania. The company uses sales profits to increase purchases from artisan partners and to expand its domestic distribution channels. 

Ten Thousand Villages is a wholesaler as well as a retailer.

Merchandise 
Ten Thousand Villages offers handmade home décor and gifts from around the world, including baskets, sculptures, jewelry, instruments, toys, tableware, planters, linens, stationery, various holiday items and other accessories. Most Ten Thousand Villages stores also sell fair trade food items such as chocolate, tea, rice, dried fruit, and coffee.

Media
In 2005, Ten Thousand Villages released "The Power of Trading Fairly," a DVD highlighting artisan partners from Bangladesh, Guatemala and Kenya, and how their lives have been improved by fair trade.

In 2006, Make Trade Fair was released, a compilation CD to raise awareness and funds for Ten Thousand Villages.

Impact 

Anecdotal evidence suggests that Ten Thousand Villages has had life-altering effects on its artisan partners. Its fair trade practices directly support tens of thousands of artisans around the world. In 2009 the company conducted their “One Reason Why” campaign which showcased some of these anecdotal stories. The campaign revolved around printed and digital materials (such as bookmarks and DVDs) that presented artisans’ “one reason why” fair trade had made a difference in their lives. Also, some of the generally small artisan groups or families have transformed into full-fledged businesses that employ hundreds to thousands of people. However, little research has been conducted to determine the quantitative impact of Ten Thousand Villages and its worldwide fair trade partnerships.

References

Garriga, Maria. New Haven, Conn., fair trade shop owners pay Third World artisans fairly. Knight Ridder Tribune Business News. Washington: 2004-12-26.

External links
 Official US site.
 Official Canadian site.
 Ten Thousand Villages at Global Anabaptist Mennonite Encyclopedia Online

Alternative trading organizations
Fair trade brands
Mennonitism in Pennsylvania
Mennonitism in the United States
Mennonitism in Canada
Organizations established in 1946